Daam-e-Mohabbat is an Urdu-language Pakistani long telefilm written by famous author and drama writer Umera Ahmed and directed by Nain Manian. Initially this drama was aired in Pakistan by TV ONE. Daam-e-Mohabbat, This telefilm premiered in Pakistan on 3 September 2011 and has been produced by Aamir Khattak.

Cast 
 Jawad Jamal
 Mehwish Hayat
 Ahsan Qadir
 Rida Naqvi
 Arshad Kamal
 Rukhsar

References 

Urdu-language telenovelas
Pakistani telenovelas
Pakistani television films